Mauricio Gallaga Valdés (born July 16, 1972, in Irapuato, Guanajuato), known as Mauricio Gallaga, is a Mexican football manager and former player.

External links
 

1972 births
Living people
Footballers from Guanajuato
People from Irapuato
Mexican footballers
Tecos F.C. footballers
Tigres UANL footballers
Santos Laguna footballers
Club Celaya footballers
Mexican football managers
Liga MX players
Association footballers not categorized by position